Cartels & Cutthroats (stylized on the box cover, but not the title screen, as ¢artels & Cutthroat$) is a 1981 video game published by Strategic Simulations.

Gameplay
Cartels & Cutthroats is a game in which the players own companies as part of an economic simulation.

Reception
Robin D. Roberts reviewed the game for Computer Gaming World, and stated that "While an excellent program, the casual gamer may find his interest wane after a short time. This game is best suited for those who are interested in marketing simulations and are willing to expend the time needed to play them well."

Bob Proctor reviewed the game for Computer Gaming World, and stated that " what is happening and includes strategy tips. There is enough information here to qualify this game as an introductory course for Micro-economics; in fact, at a recent seminar, Cartels & Cutthroats was shown as an example of Computer-Assisted Instruction. Don't let that fool you; it's a great game!"

Reviews
Computer Gaming World - Oct, 1983
Softalk
Creative Computing

References

External links
Cartels & Cutthroats at MobyGames
Review in Family Computing
Review in Electronic Fun with Computers & Games

1981 video games
Apple II games
Business simulation games
Commodore 64 games
DOS games
Multiplayer and single-player video games
Strategic Simulations games
Video games developed in the United States